Homegroup may refer to:

Cell group, a church organization
Windows HomeGroup, a home network feature that was introduced in Windows 7 and removed from Windows 10 version 1803